Kokomo may refer to:

Animals
 Kokomo (gorilla), a western lowland gorilla at the San Diego Zoo
 Kokomo Jr., a name given to two performing chimpanzees in the 1950s and 1960s

Music

Songs 
 "Kokomo Blues", by Scrapper Blackwell (1928)

 "Kokomo" (song), by the Beach Boys (1988)

 "Ko Ko Mo (I Love You So)", a rock/novelty song written in 1954 by Forest Gene Wilson and Eunice Levy and recorded by the Crew Cuts, Perry Como, and many others
 "Kokomo", by Greg Brown from The Evening Call
 "Kokomo", by Little Feat from Down on the Farm
 "Kokomo, IN", by Japanese Breakfast from Jubilee

Other 
 Kokomo (band), a British group from the 1970s
 Kokomo Records, a record company from the 1960/70s

People 
 Kokomo Arnold (1896/1901–1968), born James Arnold, American blues musician
 Kokomo (musician), one-time name used by American pianist, arranger and songwriter Jimmy Wisner (1931–2018)
 Ma-Ko-Ko-Mo (1775–1838), a chief of the Miami tribe for whom Kokomo, Indiana, was named

Places

United States 
 Kokomo, Indiana, a city in Howard County, that is also its county seat
 Indiana University Kokomo
 Kokomo, Arkansas, an unincorporated area in Lee County
 Kokomo, Colorado, a ghost town in Summit County
 Kokomo, Hawaii, a community on the island of Maui
 Kokomo, Mississippi, an unincorporated community in Marion County
 Kokomo, Texas

Kokomo Creek 
 Kokomo Creek, a tributary of the Chatanika River, Alaska
 Kokomo Creek, a creek in Hot Spring County, Arkansas
 Kokomo Creek, a tributary of Wildcat Creek (Indiana)

Elsewhere 
 Sandals Cay (formerly Kokomo Island), a privately owned island in Jamaica
 Kokomo Beach, a beach on the island of Curaçao